Bissiga is a department or commune of Boulgou Province in eastern Burkina Faso. Its capital lies at the town of Bissiga. According to the 1996 census the department has a total population of 19,264.

Towns and villages

 Bissiga (3 286 inhabitants) (capital)
 Barwagdin (529 inhabitants) 
 Belemkangrin (213 inhabitants) 
 Benna (2 116 inhabitants) 
 Bissiga-Yarcé (210 inhabitants) 
 Donsin (557 inhabitants) 
 Gambaaga (418 inhabitants) 
 Godin (1 366 inhabitants) 
 Gounghin-Grand (365 inhabitants) 
 Gounghin-Petit (338 inhabitants) 
 Kankaraboguin (169 inhabitants) 
 Koubéogo (350 inhabitants) 
 Kinzéonguin (1 509 inhabitants) 
 Koulbako (992 inhabitants) 
 Koutiama (481 inhabitants) 
 Pissalin (282 inhabitants) 
 Poestenga (3 429 inhabitants) 
 Sannabin (354 inhabitants) 
 Siraboguin (393 inhabitants) 
 Syalguin (635 inhabitants) 
 Tikanré (307 inhabitants) 
 Zamboundi (216 inhabitants) 
 Zankougdo (749 inhabitants)

References

Departments of Burkina Faso
Boulgou Province